Thespia may refer to :

 alternative spelling of Thespiae, an ancient city and former bishopric in Boeotia (Greece), also as Latin Catholic titular see
 Thespia (mythology), a daughter of river gods
 a synonym for Colotis, a genus of butterflies